The siege of Trarbach (10 April – 2 May 1734) was conducted during the War of the Polish Succession by French troops against a garrison of troops of the Holy Roman Empire in the fortress at Trarbach in the County of Sponheim, a small principality of the Holy Roman Empire (Trarbach is now in Rhineland-Palatinate, Germany).  The French, led by Marshal Belle-Isle, were victorious, and destroyed the fortress.

References
Gfrörer, August. Geschichte des achtzehnten Jahrhunderts, Volume 2 (History of the Eighteenth Century). Hurter, 1862.
Rooke, Octavius. The life of the Moselle. Booth, 1858.
Schütz, Ernst. Trarbach in alter Zeit (pp. 144ff)

Battles of the War of the Polish Succession
Sieges involving Austria
Sieges involving Spain
Sieges involving France
Conflicts in 1734
1734 in Austria
1734 in France